Kabuyea is a plant genus in the family Tecophilaeaceae, first described as a genus in 1998. It has one known species, Kabuyea hostifolia, native to Tanzania and Mozambique.

Description
Kabuyea hostifolia has a corm that lacks a protective tunic. The leaves are all basal and usually number four, both the leaves and the inflorescence emerging from the same corm-scale, and being present simultaneously. The inflorescence is a raceme, each floret having white tepals and parts in sixes.

References

Flora of Tanzania
Flora of Mozambique
Monotypic Asparagales genera
Asparagales genera